The Hollywood Star was an idiosyncratic gossip tabloid published on an erratic schedule in Hollywood, California by William Kern, who wrote much of the magazine under the pseudonym "Bill Dakota." Published in a newspaper format (and sold in newsracks), it appeared in 1976, and had stopped publishing by 1981. In 1979, it adopted a smaller magazine format which lasted two issues, as Hollywood "Confidential" Star Magazine.
Inspired by Confidential and other gossip magazines of the 1950s, The Hollywood Star had a homosexual subtext (Kern's other mid-70s paper was called Gayboy) and printed nude photos and sexually-oriented gossip with a frankness that had rarely if ever been seen in gossip magazines. In addition to naming stars who were gay or bisexual, for example, the magazine published lists of male celebrities based on whether they were circumcised. 

An unrelated newspaper called the Hollywood Star News is currently published in Portland, Oregon.

References

Defunct magazines published in the United States
Defunct newspapers published in California